Pimelea biflora, commonly known as matted rice-flower, is a species of flowering plant in the family Thymelaeaceae and is endemic to south-eastern continental Australia. It is a prostrate, mat-forming shrub with elliptic leaves and dark red flowers always arranged in pairs on the ends of branches.

Description
Pimelea biflora is a prostrate, mat-forming shrub and has hairy young stems. The upper surface of the leaves is glabrous, the lower surface with short hairs pressed against the surface. The flowers are dark red, but paler near the base.

Taxonomy
Pimelea biflora was first formally described in 1957 by Norman Arthur Wakefield and the description was published in The Victorian Naturalist. The specific epithet (biflora) means "two-flowered".

Distribution
Matted rice-flower grows in alpine and subalpine forest, heath, woodland and grassland south from Mount Gingera in the Australian Capital Territory, through southern New South Wales, to north-eastern Victoria.

References

biflora
Malvales of Australia
Flora of New South Wales
Flora of Victoria (Australia)
Flora of the Australian Capital Territory
Plants described in 1957
Taxa named by Norman Arthur Wakefield